Linny may refer to:

 A type of farm storage building with an open side also spelled linney and linhay. See circular linhay
 Linny the guinea pig, an animated character in the children's television show Wonder Pets and the film Dr. Dolittle

See also
 Linney, a list of people with the surname
 Linnie, a list of people with the given name